Osinja (Serbian Cyrillic: Осиња) is a village in the municipality of Derventa, Republika Srpska.

According to the last census (2013), the population of the village was 1407.

Geography
The village of Osinja is situated in a triangle of 3 towns: Derventa, Doboj and Prnjavor. Neighboring villages to Osinja are Pojezna, Crnča, Cerani, Velika Sočanica, Cvrtkovci and Jelanjska. In south of the village is the river Ilova which represents the border of municipalities Derventa and Stanari.

Economy
Many inhabitants are farmers; others work in school, ambulance, post office and in shops and cafes.  Many of them also work in the municipality center of Derventa, and many of them are on temporary work abroad. This and other neighboring villages were historically underdeveloped due to distance from towns. The center of the village has a school, post office, ambulance, infirmary, in addition to some shops and cafes. Recently a highway connecting Banja Luka and Doboj was built, and it partially passes Osinja. There are plans to build a highway loop in this village to connect the municipalities of Derventa and Stanari.

Culture and Religion
In this village there is an elementary school with about 300 students. Most of the inhabitants are Orthodox Christians, and there is Serbian orthodox church of St. Panteleimon near center of Osinja.

Demography
In recent decades the population of Osinja has decreased due to economic reasons. Many inhabitants moved to municipality center Derventa, but also to Austria, Germany, Italy, Slovenia and other European countries.

People from Osinja
Dragan Đurić, former president of FK Partizan
 Слободан Ћустић, Serbian actor

References

Villages in Republika Srpska
Derventa
Populated places in Derventa